Sorry Everybody was a website created after the 2004 United States presidential election, which invited U.S. citizens to apologize to the world in advance for the actions of George W. Bush in the next four years. Its most prominent feature was the gallery, which contains images submitted by visitors holding various apology notes. The website became massively popular in the aftermath of the presidential elections, leading some Bush supporters to create spinoffs to express they were not sorry.

The website was created by James Zetlen, an American neuroscience student who was at the time in the third year of his undergraduate program at the University of Southern California in Los Angeles. The first photo was taken by Zetlen of himself, in his home in Los Angeles on November 3, 2004, just after the concession of John Kerry in the 2004 U.S. presidential election (which had been held a day earlier, on November 2, 2004). Zetlen's photo inspired thousands more similar contributions from U.S. citizens, and he compiled a gallery of 8,000 of these photos on his website and published a 256-page book containing approximately 1,000 of them, entitled Sorry Everybody: An Apology to the World for the Re-election of George W. Bush.

After Barack Obama's victory in the 2008 presidential election, the title of the site changed to "Hello Everybody", and Zetlen invited submissions again—this time of celebratory pictures of Americans reintroducing themselves to the world.

External links
Sorry Everybody / Hello Everybody home page
BBC article on the site
Apologies Accepted site

Internet memes
American political websites
2004 United States presidential election in popular culture
Internet properties established in 2004